State Trunk Highway 29 (often called Highway 29, STH-29 or WIS 29) is a state highway running east–west across central Wisconsin. It is a major east–west corridor connecting the Twin Cities and the Chippewa Valley with Wausau and Green Bay. A multi-year project to upgrade the corridor to a four-lane freeway or expressway from Elk Mound to Green Bay was completed in 2005.  The expansion served to improve safety on the route, which was over capacity as a two-lane road.  The remainder of WIS 29 is two-lane surface road or urban multi-lane road.

Route description

Prescott to Elk Mound 
WIS 29 begins at its western terminus at U.S. Highway 10 (US 10), on the north side of Prescott. From this point, WIS 29 follows WIS 35 northeast to River Falls, passing the University of Wisconsin–River Falls campus. At the junction with WIS 65, WIS 35 turns northbound with WIS 65 while WIS 29 continues east. Upon leaving Spring Valley and Pierce County, Wisconsin, the highway heads northwardward into St. Croix County and turns east towards Menomonie. WIS 29 does not pass through any municipalities while in this county, but it does cross WIS 128.

Upon entering Dunn County, the route passes through rural terrain and enters Menomonie's west side as Hudson Road. The highway turns northward onto Main Street and passes west and north of the University of Wisconsin–Stout campus. WIS 29 turns east onto Stout Road along with US 12 and leaves the city to the east. This interchange is the westernmost point of the multi-lane WIS 29 corridor. It is also the westernmost point of WIS 29 as a backbone route in Corridors 2020.

Elk Mound to Wausau 
West of County Highway T (CTH-T), the highway is an expressway. It passes into the Chippewa Valley metropolitan area and south of Chippewa Falls as a freeway and crosses US 53 at a cloverleaf interchange in Lake Hallie. WIS 29 junctions with the southern terminus of WIS 178 southeast of Chippewa Falls then passes to the south of Lake Wissota State Park before crossing under WIS 27 in Cadott. WIS 29 passes south of Boyd and Stanley before exiting the county to the east.

In Clark County, WIS 29 meets WIS 73 in Thorp. WIS 29 continues east and passes south of Owen and Curtiss. At Abbotsford, WIS 29 and WIS 13 meet at a partial cloverleaf interchange between Abbotsford and Colby on the Clark–Marathon county line.  east of Abbotsford, WIS 29 and WIS 97 meet at a diamond interchange. This is a key route for travelers between Wausau and Marshfield.

Wausau to Green Bay 

South of Wausau, WIS 29 turns off US 51 to the east at the northern terminus of I-39 and continues as freeway, passing through the villages of Rothschild and Weston. The freeway section ends at Ringle. As an expressway, the highway passes just south of Hatley and turns southeast for about four miles (6 km) before turning east again at the northern terminus of WIS 49.

WIS 29 passes north and around Wittenberg. WIS 29 bypasses Tilleda and Thornton on the way towards Shawano. At Shawano, the expressway becomes a freeway at the junction with CTH-MMM (WIS 29 Business) and turns southeast to bypass Shawano to the south, diamond interchanges link the highway with WIS 22 and WIS 47 north/WIS 55 north as it pass south of the city. WIS 47 south and WIS 55 south follow WIS 29 east. WIS 47 splits to the south at the diamond interchange junction with WIS 117 south of Bonduel. WIS 29 (along with WIS 55) then returns to an expressway at the junction with CTH-BE (WIS 29's former route). WIS 55 splits to the south at the diamond interchange junction with WIS 160 at Angelica and WIS 29 heads southeast to the Brown County line.

About  into Brown County, WIS 29 collects WIS 32 eastbound at the diamond interchange with WIS 156 and CTH-Y. WIS 29 very briefly passes through the northeast corner of Outagamie County and enters the village of Howard. The multilane expressway and the Backbone Corridor route end at Interstate 41/US 41. WIS 32 turns south onto I-41/US 41 as WIS 29 continues into Green Bay as Shawano Avenue.

Green Bay to Kewaunee 

In downtown Green Bay, WIS 29 turns north onto South Monroe Avenue for four blocks, joining with WIS 54 and turns east onto Main Street, splitting from WIS 54 and joining US 141 to leave the city to the southeast. The highways pass over I-43 without an interchange. This provides the only access from I-43 to WIS 29. The highway passes through Poland and Henrysville as it exits Brown County to the east. In Kewaunee County, WIS 29 passes due east through Pilsen and north of Krok as a two-lane road. The highway ends in downtown Kewaunee at WIS 42 on the shores of Lake Michigan.

History 

Prior to 1926, WIS 29 was numbered WIS 116 from Minnesota to Chippewa Falls, WIS 16 from Chippewa Falls to Bellevue, and WIS 146 from Bellevue to Kewaunee. WIS 16 continued southeast from Bellevue along what became US 141 in 1926 to Manitowoc. What had been WIS 29 before 1926 became US 16 across the state.

WIS 29 has long been known as "Bloody 29" because of the prevalence of grisly fatal traffic crashes along significant portions of the highway. In 1988, a study was commissioned to examine upgrading the highway to a four-lane divided highway. The final segment of the highway, connecting the east side of Chippewa Falls with the segment running north of Eau Claire, was opened to traffic on August 16, 2005. Most of the expansion was completed with only minor additions to the already-existing easements, and as a result, the expanded roadway almost exactly matches the highway's original course.

The portion of WIS 29 between Chippewa Falls and Abbotsford roughly follows what used to be the Yellowstone Trail.

Future
Long range plans call for WIS 29 to be converted to a full freeway between I-94 in Elk Mound and I-41 in Green Bay, however, there is no timetable for the entire corridor to be completed.

Major intersections

Business routes 

WIS 29 has four business routes:
 Business WIS 29 in Chippewa Falls
 Business WIS 29 in Abbotsford
 Business WIS 29 in Wittenberg
 Business WIS 29 in Shawano

See also

References

External links 

029
Transportation in Pierce County, Wisconsin
Transportation in St. Croix County, Wisconsin
Transportation in Dunn County, Wisconsin
Transportation in Chippewa County, Wisconsin
Transportation in Clark County, Wisconsin
Transportation in Marathon County, Wisconsin
Transportation in Shawano County, Wisconsin
Transportation in Brown County, Wisconsin
Transportation in Kewaunee County, Wisconsin
Transportation in Green Bay, Wisconsin
U.S. Route 16